Nabichum (literally 'butterfly dance') is a Korean Buddhist dance (Jakbeop) for ritual service. The dance is named after its choreography and costume which resemble the appearance of butterfly (nabi in Korean). Some people regard nabichum as the most representative and important dance among Korean Buddhist dances. Dancers wear jangsam (장삼: monks robe) and white gokkal (꼬깔: a peaked hat).

See also
Barachum
Beopgochum
Korean dance
Korean Buddhism

External links
 Brief information about Nabichum at the Dusan Encyclopedia:Encyber
 Origin of Nabichum at the Ministry of Culture and Tourism of South Korea

Korean dance
Buddhism in Korea
Ritual dances
Buddhist rituals